= Badli, Belagavi =

Coordinates: 15°50′14″N 75°03′28″E

Badli is a village in Belagavi district in the southern state of Karnataka, India, with a population of 1,583.
